Cities of the Underworld is an American documentary television series that premiered on March 2, 2007, on the History channel. The program explores the subterranean environment and culture beneath various civilizations. The series was originally hosted and narrated by Eric Geller for the majority of episodes in season 1, with Don Wildman taking over for the rest of season 1 and seasons 2 and 3.

Episode list
"Istanbul" is the series backdoor pilot which originally aired under the title Ancient Marvels: Cities of the Underworld.

Season 1

Season 2

Season 3

Season 4

References

External links
 
 History Channel Films at Glenbrook Tunnel, Sydney, Australia
 
 
Authentic Entertainment's Official Site

History (American TV channel) original programming
2000s American documentary television series
Urban exploration
Subterranea (geography)
2007 American television series debuts
2009 American television series endings
Television series by Authentic Entertainment